Antelope Valley California Poppy Reserve is a state-protected reserve of California, United States, harboring the most consistent blooms of California poppies, the state flower. To the north is Kern County. The reserve is administered by the California Department of Parks and Recreation. Other wildflowers within the reserve include the Owl's Clover, Lupine, Goldfields, Cream Cups and Coreopsis.

The Reserve
The intense blooming season for the California Poppy usually falls within late winter to early spring, during the months of mid-February through mid-May. Blooming seasons are dependent on the amount of rainfall during the winter to early spring seasons.

In order to keep the fields in a strictly natural state, California State Parks does not water or stimulate the flowers. The park service also excludes sheep and cattle from grazing the hillsides. Until the early 1970s, sheep once grazed the buttes in the western Antelope Valley. Pronghorn grazed long before then, until the railroad arrived in 1876.  With the exception of service dogs, pets are prohibited from the reserve. Under California state law, visitors are also prohibited from taking flowers from the reserve.

Since 1994, controlled fires have been used to regulate dead brush, exotic species and litter within the reserve.

See also
List of California Native Plants
List of California State Parks
Natural History of the Mojave Desert

References

External links
California State Parks: Official Antelope Valley California Poppy Reserve Website

California State Reserves
Antelope Valley
Protected areas of the Mojave Desert
Protected areas of Los Angeles County, California
IUCN protected area omissions
Protected areas established in 1976
1976 establishments in California